Cavity Job is the debut EP by British electronic music duo Autechre, and their first release under the "Autechre" name. It was originally released as a 12" vinyl record on Hardcore Records in December 1991, with just over 1,000 copies pressed. It was included on CD for the first time in the EPs 1991–2002 compilation, released by Warp on 11 April 2011.

Track listing

References

External links 
Discogs entry
HARD003
Cavity Job on vinyl (with audio clips)

1991 EPs